The Kyll, noted by the Roman poet Ausonius as Celbis, is a  river in western Germany (North Rhine-Westphalia and Rhineland-Palatinate), left tributary of the Moselle. It rises in the Eifel mountains, near the border with Belgium and flows generally south through the towns Stadtkyll, Gerolstein, Kyllburg and east of Bitburg. It flows into the Moselle in Ehrang, a suburb of Trier.

See also 
List of rivers of North Rhine-Westphalia
List of rivers of Rhineland-Palatinate

References 

Rivers of North Rhine-Westphalia
Rivers of Rhineland-Palatinate
Rivers of the Eifel
Rivers of Germany